Otto Leberecht Lesser (16 October 1830 – 12 August 1887) was a German astronomer who co-discovered asteroid 62 Erato with Wilhelm Julius Foerster on September 14, 1860 at the Berlin Observatory. This was the first co-discovery on record.

References 
 

1830 births
1887 deaths
Discoverers of asteroids

19th-century German astronomers
Recipients of the Lalande Prize